Thet Mon Myint (born Zung Cer Mawi; on 23 July 1982) is a two-time Myanmar Academy Award winning actress and model. She is the Myanmar's fourth highest-paid actress. In 2019, she was listed on The Myanmar Times' "Top 10 Actor" list.

Thet Mon Myint is an ethnic Chin from Chin State in western Myanmar.

Early life

Thet Mon Myint was born on 23 July 1982 in Falam by Myint U and Daw Myaing, of Chin descent. She went to B.E.H.S(1) Falam, Chin State and graduated from Yangon Institute of Economics.

Career
Starting from early 2000s, she began her career as a model in music videos of famous singers in Myanmar. In 2003, 2004, and 2005, she became a household name for her cute and innocent acting in TV commercials. She was replaced as the Queen of TVC after the famous actress, Htet Htet Moe Oo.

Then, she rose into fame of the top actress in 2009. From 2010, she established herself as one of the leading actresses in Myanmar. Nowadays, she is considered as one of the most popular and talented actresses of Burmese cinema.

At the time of her acting debut, Thet Mon Myint faces many difficulty in communicating with cast members because she has Chin accent when she speaks Burmese. But she has now overcome this problem.

She has received two Myanmar Academy Awards for Best Actress for her role in the films Adam, Eve and Datsa for 2012 and My Lovely Hate for 2016.

Political activities
Following the 2021 Myanmar coup d'état, Thet Mon Myint was active in the anti-coup movement both in person at rallies and through social media. Denouncing the military coup, she has taken part in protests since February. He joined the "We Want Justice" three-finger salute movement. The movement was launched on social media, and many celebrities have joined the movement.

On 3 April 2021, warrants for her arrest were issued under section 505 (a) of the penal code by the State Administration Council for speaking out against the military coup. Along with several other celebrities, she was charged with calling for participation in the Civil Disobedience Movement (CDM) and damaging the state's ability to govern, with supporting the Committee Representing Pyidaungsu Hluttaw, and with generally inciting the people to disturb the peace and stability of the nation.

Personal life
Thet Mon Myint married to Tsit Naing in 2014. On 12 April 2015, she gave birth to a son, Arr Chit and to a daughter, La Won May (San Mawi) on 13 December 2016.

Filmography

Films (Big Screen)

Television Series

Awards and nominations

Myanmar Academy Awards

Focus Online Audience Choice Awards

References

External links
 

1982 births
Living people
Converts to Buddhism from Christianity
Burmese film actresses
Burmese female models
People from Chin State
Burmese people of Chin descent
21st-century Burmese actresses